Neerchal is a village in Kasaragod district of Kerala state, India. Neerchal is located 12 kilometers from Kasaragod.

Demographics
As of 2011 Indian census, Neerchal village had total population of 12,369 which constitutes 6,223 males and 6,146 females. The sex ratio of Neerchal was 988 lower than state average of 1,084. The population of children below 6 years was 11%. Neerchal had overall literacy of 89% lower than state average of 94 %. The male literacy stands at 93.7% and female literacy at 84.4.

The Peradala Neerchal School is situated in this village. Neerchal belongs to Badiadka Grama Panchayath.

References

Suburbs of Kasaragod